WHBC-FM (94.1 MHz) is a commercial radio station in Canton, Ohio, United States with a hot adult contemporary format. The station was established in 1948 as the sister station to WHBC, and it has been commonly owned with the AM station ever since.

In the 1980s WHBC-FM aired a Beautiful Music format using reel to reel tapes. By 2007, the station gradually morphed from adult contemporary to modern adult contemporary and in later years moved to a traditional adult top 40 format.  Mediabase reports the station as a hot adult contemporary.

External links

HBC-FM
Hot adult contemporary radio stations in the United States
Alpha Media radio stations